The Banff and Buchan District Council election, 1988, took place on Thursday 5 May 1988, alongside elections to the councils of Scotland's various other districts.

The election saw the Scottish National Party (SNP) making gains at the expense of Independent councillors, though the independent councillors retained a majority.

Aggregate results

References

1988 Scottish local elections
1988